Chris Hickey is an American singer-songwriter from Los Angeles. He was a member of the punk-pop band The Spoilers, the folky trio Show of Hands (one of the first American bands to perform in China), and the alt folk rock band, Uma. He has six solo records and his voice and/or his songs have appeared on records by Sally Dworsky, Joe Henry, Michael Penn, Indigo Girls, Scott Seskind, Shannon Worrell, Phil Cody, Dean Stefan, and Craig Wisda.

Hickey has four children, one of whom is singer-songwriter Charlie Hickey. He is married to singer Sally Dworsky. He is a vegan and a Buddhist.

Discography

Also appears on:

References

External links
 Official Website

Living people
Date of birth missing (living people)
Place of birth missing (living people)
American singer-songwriters
American male singer-songwriters
Year of birth missing (living people)